Harrogate and Knaresborough is a parliamentary constituency in North Yorkshire which has been represented in the House of Commons of the UK Parliament since 2010 by Andrew Jones, an MP from the Conservative Party. The constituency was formed in the 1997 boundary changes, before which it was named Harrogate.

Constituency profile
An area with little unemployment, a relatively large retired population and large neighbourhoods of high house prices the former Harrogate constituency was a safe Conservative seat.  When former Chancellor Norman Lamont stood for the Harrogate and Knaresborough seat in the Labour landslide general election in 1997, Harrogate moved the way of other spa towns in England such as Bath, and more urban and less touristic Cheltenham, by returning a non-Conservative candidate. The Liberal Democrat MP Phil Willis was elected, and served until Andrew Jones regained the seat for his party on Willis's retirement in the 2010 general election with a swing of 9.1% and a margin of 1,039 votes.

Boundaries

1997–2010: The Borough of Harrogate wards of Bilton, Duchy, East Central, Granby, Harlow, Knaresborough East, Knaresborough West, New Park, Pannal, Starbeck, Wedderburn, and West Central.

2010–present: The Borough of Harrogate wards of Bilton, Boroughbridge, Claro, Granby, Harlow Moor, High Harrogate, Hookstone, Killinghall, Knaresborough East, Knaresborough King James, Knaresborough Scriven Park, Low Harrogate, New Park, Pannal, Rossett, Saltergate, Starbeck, Stray, and Woodfield.

History
Before 1950 the two eponymous towns had been part of the Ripon constituency.  The constituency was created as Harrogate and following boundary changes in 1997 the name was changed to 'Harrogate and Knaresborough'.

The current constituency embraces three former borough constituencies: Aldborough (now a suburb of Boroughbridge civil parish) and Boroughbridge, which were abolished as 'rotten boroughs' by the Great Reform Act, 1832, and Knaresborough, abolished in 1885.

Members of Parliament

Elections

Elections in the 2010s

Elections in the 2000s

Elections in the 1990s

See also
List of parliamentary constituencies in North Yorkshire

Notes

References

Parliamentary constituencies in Yorkshire and the Humber
Constituencies of the Parliament of the United Kingdom established in 1997
Politics of the Borough of Harrogate